Mbaama (Lembaamba) is a Bantu language spoken in the Bambama District (Lekoumou Region) of the Republic of Congo and in Haut-Ogooué Province, south of Okondja, in Gabon by the Obamba people.

References

Bibliography

External links
 Ombamba at WolframAlpha

Languages of the Republic of the Congo
Languages of Gabon
Mbete languages